Saturday Morning is the fifth Our Gang short subject comedy released. The Our Gang series (later known as "The Little Rascals") was created by Hal Roach in 1922, and continued production until 1944.

Synopsis
The various boys of the gang each manage to escape their responsibilities for the day, meeting up to build a raft for their pirate game.

Notes
When the television rights for the original silent Pathé Our Gang comedies were sold to National Telepix and other distributors, several episodes were retitled. This film was released into television syndication as "Mischief Makers" in 1960 under the title Music Lesson. About two-thirds of the original film was included. Most of scenes from the first half of the film that showed the various gang members at home were cut; all of the original inter-titles were also cut.  The film was also released for home viewing as "Hooray for Holidays".

Cast

The Gang
 Jackie Condon as Jackie
 Mickey Daniels as Mickey
 Jack Davis as Waldemar
 Allen Hoskins as Maple
 Ernest Morrison as Sorghum
 Dinah the Mule as herself

Additional cast
 William Gillespie as Waldemar's father
 Joseph Morrison as Aunty Jackson
 Katherine Grant as The maid
 Richard Daniels as The cello teacher

External links 
 
 

1922 films
1922 comedy films
Hal Roach Studios short films
American silent short films
American black-and-white films
Films directed by Robert F. McGowan
Our Gang films
1922 short films
1920s American films
Silent American comedy films
1920s English-language films